Krishnapillai Thurairajasingam (born 28 July 1956) is a Sri Lankan Tamil lawyer, politician, provincial minister and former Member of Parliament.

Early life
Thurairajasingam was born on 28 July 1956.

Career
Thurairajasingam is an attorney at law.

Thurairajasingam contested the 1994 parliamentary election as one of the Tamil United Liberation Front's candidates in Batticaloa District and was elected to Parliament. He contested the 2012 provincial council election as one of the Tamil National Alliance's candidates in Batticaloa District and was elected to the Eastern Provincial Council (EPC). Thurairajasingam and the other newly elected TNA provincial councillors took their oaths on 28 September 2012 in front of TNA leader and Member of Parliament R. Sampanthan. During the election campaign Thurairajasingam house was padlocked from the outside in a futile attempt to prevent him submitting the TNA's nominations.

Thurairajasingam became the Illankai Tamil Arasu Kachchi's (ITAK) general secretary in September 2014. Following the 2015 presidential election an all party provincial government was formed in the Eastern Province. Thurairajasingam took his oath as Minister of Agriculture and Irrigation in front of Governor Austin Fernando on 3 March 2015.

References

1956 births
Agriculture ministers of Sri Lankan provinces
Illankai Tamil Arasu Kachchi politicians
Living people
Members of the 10th Parliament of Sri Lanka
Members of the Eastern Province Board of Ministers
People from Batticaloa
Sri Lankan Hindus
Sri Lankan Tamil lawyers
Sri Lankan Tamil politicians
Tamil National Alliance politicians
Tamil United Liberation Front politicians